Jalaluddin Muhammad Shah (born as Jadu) was a 15th-century Sultan of Bengal and an important figure in medieval Bengali history. Born a Hindu to his aristocratic father Raja Ganesha, the patriarch of the Ganesha dynasty, he assumed the throne of Bengal after a coup which overthrew the Ilyas Shahi dynasty. He converted to Islam and ruled the Bengal Sultanate for 16 years. As a Muslim king, he brought Arakan under Bengali suzerainty and consolidated the kingdom's domestic administrative centres. He pursued relations with the Timurid Empire, Mamluk Egypt and Ming China. Bengal grew in wealth and population during his reign. He also combined Bengali and Islamic architecture.

First phase (1415–1416)
According to Goron and Goenka, Raja Ganesha seized control over Bengal soon after the death of Sultan Bayazid (1412–1414). Facing an imminent threat of invasion at the behest of a powerful Muslim holy man named Nur Qutb Alam, he appealed to the saint to call off his threat. The saint agreed on the condition that Raja Ganesha's son Jadu would convert to Islam and rule in his place. Raja Ganesha agreed and Jadu started ruling Bengal as Jalal al-Din in 1415 AD. Nur Qutb Alam died in 1416 AD and Raja Ganesha was emboldened to depose his son and accede to the throne himself as Danujamarddana Deva. Jalaluddin was reconverted to Hinduism by the Golden Cow ritual. After the death of his father he once again converted to Islam and started ruling his second phase.

Second phase (1418–1433)

Jalaluddin maintained a peaceful kingdom during his second phase. His authority stretched to eastern Bengal Moazzamabad (present-day Sunamganj) and south-eastern Bengal (present-day Chittagong). He also conquered Fathabad (present-day Faridpur) and the southern Bengal. During his reign Firuzabad Pandua became a populous and flourishing town. It is recorded in the Ming shi that a Chinese explorer, Cheng Ho, visited the city twice in 1421–22 and 1431–33. He later transferred the capital from Pandua to Gaur. The city of Gaur began to be re-populated during his reign. Jalaluddin himself constructed a number of buildings and sarais there.

Relation with Hindus
Jalaluddin played a distinguished role in converting the Hindus of Bengal to Islam. Dr. James Wise wrote in the Journal of the Asiatic Society of Bengal (1894) that "the only condition he offered was either the Koran or death. Many Hindus fled to Kamrup and the jungles of Assam, but it is nevertheless possible that more Muslims were added to Islam during these seventeen years (1414–31) than in the next three hundred years." He maintained good rapport with Non-Muslims in his kingdom. According to an interpretation of a Sanskrit sloka by D. C. Bhattacharya, Jalaluddin appointed Rajyadhar, a Hindu, as the commander of his army. He gained support of Muslim scholars – Ulama and the Shaikhs. He reconstructed and repaired the mosques and other religious architectures destroyed by Raja Ganesha.

The 17th century Persian historian, Firishta talked about his tolerance of Hindus and Buddhists, applauded him by saying:

His remark is corroborated by the evidence of the Smritiratnahara and the Padachandrika. According to the Padachandrika, a commentary on the Amarakosha in Sanskrit, Brihaspati Mishra, a Brahmin from Kulingram (present-day Bardhaman district), was promoted by Sultan Jalaluddin to the position of the Sarvabhaumapandita (Court Scholar). And Vishvasrai, son of Brihaspati Mishra, was also appointed a minister by the Sultan. He patronized Sankritic culture by publicly showing appreciation for those scholars of classical Brahmanic scholarship. Many Brahmin poets were honored by Jalaluddin.

According to a 19th-century chronicle written by Francis Buchanan-Hamilton, Jalaluddin compelled many Hindus to convert to Islam, resulting in many Hindus fleeing to Kamrup.

Relation with foreign rulers
He also maintained good diplomatic relations. He was in correspondence with the Timurid ruler Shah Rukh of Herat, Yung Le of China and al-Ashraf Barsbay, the Mamluk ruler of Egypt. Ibrahim Sharqi attacked his kingdom but censure from Yung Le and Shah Rukh caused him to withdraw. Jalaluddin helped Meng Soamun Narmeikhla, King of Arakan, to recover his kingdom from Burma; in return he became the overlord of Arakan. He, at some point, also ruled over parts of Tripura and southern Bihar.

Jalaluddin tried to legitimise his rule by publicly displaying his credentials as a devout and correct Muslim. Contemporary Arab sources hold that upon his conversion to Islam, Jalaluddin adopted the Hanafi legal tradition.

Between 1428 and 1431, he also supported the construction of two Islamic institutions in Makkah and Madinah, known as Bangaliyah Madaris. The Sultan gained permission by establishing close ties with and presenting Barakat ibn Hasan, the Sharif of Makkah, with gifts and robes of honour. Jalaluddin also kept good relations with Barsbay, the Mamluk sultan. According to Al-Sakhawi's Al-Daw al-lami` li ahli al-Qarni al-Tasi, Barsbay once gifted the Bengali sultan with investiture, a robe of honour and a letter of recognition. Jalaluddin had died before his own gifts could be dispatched to Barsbay and this job was left for his son, Shamsuddin Ahmad Shah, to be completed.

In 1427, Jalaluddin described himself in an inscription as Al-sultan al-azam al-muazzamin khalifat Allah 'ali al-makunin Jalal al-Dunya w'al-Din (the most exalted of the great sultans, the caliph of Allah in the universe).

Coins
Several undated issues of his silver coins and a huge commemorative silver coin minted in Pandua in 1421, bear the stylised figure of a lion. One theory says that they were issued to celebrate the arrival of a Chinese ambassador. Another theory says that they marked the withdrawal of Jaunpur's threatening army. Asides from him, the lion-motif coins were also issued by Nasiruddin Mahmud Shah I and Jalaluddin Fateh Shah. Such type of coins were also issued by the kingdom of Tripura in 1464, thus precluding the possibility that Jalaluddin was following the kingdom's custom. Since the lion is seen as the vehicle of the Goddess as Chandi in whose name the Sena dynasty rebelled from 1416 to 1418, it is possible he attempted to appeal to the deeply-rooted sentiments of Goddess-worship. In 1427, he had described himself in a description on a mosque as the most exalted of the great sultans, the caliph of Allah in the universe.  Having tested this, in 1430 he took a bolder step by including "Caliph of Allah" (Khalifat al-Allah) as one of his titles on his coins. In 1431 AD he issued a new coin inscribing Kalema-tut-shahadat. Thus he reintroduced on his coins the Kalimah, which had disappeared from Bengal Sultanate coins for several centuries.

Death
He died in Rabi 2, 837 AH (1433 AD) and was disputably buried in the Eklakhi Mausoleum at Pandua.

See also
 List of rulers of Bengal
 History of Bengal
 History of India

References

Hanafis
Indian former Hindus
Sultans of Bengal
Muslim missionaries
Converts to Islam from Hinduism
15th-century Indian monarchs
1433 deaths
Year of birth unknown
15th-century Bengalis
Sunni Muslims
People from Dinajpur District, Bangladesh